Domains by Proxy (DBP) is an Internet company owned by the founder of GoDaddy, Bob Parsons.  Domains by Proxy offers domain privacy services through partner domain registrars such as GoDaddy and Wild West Domains.

Subscribers list Domains by Proxy as their administrative and technical contacts in the Internet's WHOIS database, thereby delegating responsibility for managing unsolicited contacts from third parties and keeping the domains owners' personal information secret.  However, the company will release a registrant's personal information in some cases, such as by court order or for other reasons as deemed appropriate by the company per its Domain Name Proxy Agreement.

As of 2014, over 9,850,000 domain names use the Domains by Proxy service.

Political usage
In the run-up to the 2012 United States presidential primaries, numerous domain names with derogatory expressions have been registered through Domains by Proxy by both Republicans and Democrats.

Domains by Proxy have allegedly been a target of the Internet organization Anonymous due to perceived malicious business activities including inducements to join their service, claims of privacy that are not fulfilled and the lowering of Google PageRank of the sites they link to.

Controversy

Fraudsters
Controversially, Domains By Proxy is also used by a number of organizations such as Clearance.co that target vulnerable individuals by sending threatening psychic letters, such as zodiac-services.com, and fake drug companies such as the now-defunct uk-online-pharmacy.com.
It is also used by fake anti-spyware and anti-malware sites like malwarefixes.com and 2-spyware.com to hide their real ownership of the software that they promote.

Advance Fee fraudsters also use Domains By Proxy. On 5 Feb 2016, the Artists Against 419 database reflected 1124 out of 108684 entries abused the services of Domains By Proxy. This represents a figure of slightly over one percent of the entries.

Privacy
In 2014, Domains by Proxy handed over personal details of a site owner to Motion Picture Association due to potential copyright infringement despite the website not hosting any copyrighted files.

See also 
 Internet privacy

Footnotes

External links
 www.domainsbyproxy.com — Domains by Proxy site

Domain Name System
Privacy organizations
GoDaddy